The Digital Archive Project (DAP) was an online collaboration that provided advice and support for individuals interested publishing television programs that are not produced or distributed through mainstream content distribution. DAP offered support on capturing television broadcasts, how to clean up old VHS recordings, and how to author DVDs.

The project consisted of a loose online association of people formed through common interests in humor, encoding, and archiving television programs that would otherwise not see the light of day. The group did not attempt to publish or make these shows available.

History
The DAP was originally created as a means of sharing and preserving, in a digital format, episodes of the cult classic TV show Mystery Science Theater 3000, originally from a suggestion in the Ars Technica forums in the year 2000. The size of the group has fluctuated in size over the years, all while having many shows added to the list of archived material. The current qualifications for a show to be on the list include: no commercial release, no immediate plans for release, and not currently in production.

The group did not host any of these files; however, when one joins the IRC channel there are people there who may assist visitors, depending on the visitor's behaviour.

As of July 7th, 2022, the site appears to be offline.

Shows

Current shows
 Mystery Science Theater 3000
 Single episodes compressed to under 700 megabytes
 DVD-quality (and size) encodes
 Various specials, guest appearances, documentaries, etc.
 Brimstone
 Cartoon Planet
 Dennis Miller Live
 EZ Streets
 Let's Bowl
 On the Air
 Quark
 The Mystery Science Theater Hour

Past shows
In the case of DAP-supported material gaining an official release, the material is dropped from the DAP's list and trading it is no longer permitted.  Shows dropped from the DAP include:
 Aqua Teen Hunger Force
 Clone High
 Duckman
 Dr. Katz, Professional Therapist
 Freakazoid!
 Harvey Birdman, Attorney at Law
 Home Movies
 Invader Zim
 Max Headroom
 Mission Hill
 Mystery Science Theater 3000 (episodes which have been released to home video)
 NewsRadio
 Parker Lewis Can't Lose
 Samurai Jack
 SCTV
 Sealab 2021
 Space Ghost Coast to Coast
 The Brak Show
 The Critic
 TV Funhouse
 Upright Citizens Brigade

External links
 Home of the Digital Archive Project
 DAP BitTorrent tracker

References

Television archives in the United States